The 1924 Minneapolis Marines season was their fourth in the league and final as the Marines. The team failed to improve on their previous output of 2–5–2, losing six games. They tied for sixteenth place in the league.

Schedule

Standings

References

Minneapolis Marines seasons
Minneapolis Marines
Marines
National Football League winless seasons